Éamon de Valera Forest (Hebrew: יער איימון דה ואלירה) is a forest in Israel, near Nazareth. It was planted in 1966 and named after American-born Irish politician and statesman Éamon de Valera.

History

The planting and dedication of the forest was arranged by the Dublin Jewish community, in recognition of De Valera's consistent support for Ireland's Jews.  In the Irish Constitution of 1937, the drafting of which was personally supervised by De Valera, the writing of the Constitution specifically gave constitutional protection to Jews. This was considered to be a necessary component to the constitution by Éamon de Valera because of the treatment of Jews elsewhere in Europe at the time.

In 1948 De Valera overruled the Department of Justice when it barred one hundred and fifty refugee Jewish children from travelling to Ireland as refugees.

During its dedication to De Valera, Israeli Prime Minister Levi Eshkol read out loud a message to honour the occasion and Ireland-Israel relations in general, saying that the Jews and Irish both "have so much in common."

See also
 History of the Jews in Ireland

References

1966 establishments in Israel
Forests of Israel
Éamon de Valera
Ireland–Israel relations
Jewish Irish history
Jews and Judaism in the Republic of Ireland
Protected areas established in 1966
Levi Eshkol